Devine Redding (born February 5, 1996) is an American football running back who is currently a free agent. He played college football at Indiana.

High school career
Redding played his Freshman year for Austintown Fitch High School. At the beginning of his Sophomore year, he transferred to Mineral Ridge High School to play the next two years as a standout running back and outside linebacker. He transferred again to Glenville High School for his senior year where his team reached the OHSAA DIV II State Championship. He received honorable mention all-state his senior year and was rated the 58th running back nationally, in 2013, according to 247Sports.com.

Recruiting
Redding received offers from West Virginia and Indiana, while also considering Cincinnati, Akron and Ohio State. Redding committed to Indiana in October 2013.

College career

Freshman year
In 2014, Redding played in 10 games, rushing for 118 yards with 1 touchdown. His sole touchdown would come in the 5th week of the season against North Texas on October 4.

Sophomore year
Following the departure of Tevin Coleman to the 2015 NFL Draft, Redding was utilized as one of Indiana's main running backs for the 2015 season; Redding would split time during the season with future NFL running back Jordan Howard. Redding started four games, appeared in all 12 regular season games and participated in Indiana's bid to the Pinstripe Bowl. Redding would finish the season with 1,012 yards rushing, including a Pinstripe Bowl record-setting performance with 227 yards and 1 touchdown and IU Offensive Player of the Week (against Duke). His rushing numbers for 2015 put him 17th overall in program history for yards ran in a single season.

Junior year
Prior to the start of the 2016 season, Redding was added to the list of candidates for the Doak Walker Award. Redding finished the year with 1,122 total yards rushing and 7 touchdowns. This was the second year in a row that Redding finished the season with more than 1,000 yards rushing. Redding received 2016 All-Big Ten honorable mention honors. On January 6, 2017, Redding announced that he would forego his senior season and declare for the 2017 NFL Draft.

Statistics

Professional career

Kansas City Chiefs
Redding was signed by the Kansas City Chiefs as an undrafted free agent on May 9, 2017. He was waived on September 2, 2017 and was signed to the Chiefs' practice squad the next day. He was released on September 6, 2017.

Tampa Bay Buccaneers
On August 26, 2018, Redding was signed by the Tampa Bay Buccaneers. He was waived on September 1, 2018.

References

External links
 Indiana Hoosiers Profile

1996 births
Living people
Players of American football from Youngstown, Ohio
American football running backs
Indiana Hoosiers football players
Kansas City Chiefs players
Tampa Bay Buccaneers players